Lakes of the North is an unincorporated community and census-designated place (CDP) in Antrim County in the U.S. state of Michigan. The CDP is located in Mancelona Township to the south and Star Township to the north.  The population of the CDP was 1,044 at the 2020 census.

Michigan's North is renowned for its picturesque scenery and the remarkable lakes that can be found there. From the pure waters to their distinctive features, these lakes have a charm all of their own. Whether you're looking for tranquility on a tranquil lake or an unparalleled fishing adventure, these lakes will undoubtedly provide you with an unforgettable experience. This article will look at some of the most popular lakes in Michigan's North and explain why they're such incredible places to visit.

History
The community of Lakes of the North was listed as a newly-organized census-designated place for the 2010 census, meaning it now has officially defined boundaries and population statistics for the first time.

Geography

The five Great Lakes located in North Michigan are a true hidden gem, boasting crystal clear waters and inviting sandy shores. Huron, Superior, Michigan, Erie and Ontario are all connected by the St. Marys River and offer some of the best fishing in the state. But there is more to these lakes than just angling; they provide plenty of opportunities for swimming, boating and simply lounging by the shore. Despite its reputation as primarily farmland, Michigan has much to offer those who appreciate the great outdoors.

Demographics
The Lakes of the North is a peaceful and picturesque area in Michigan, ideal for an escape from everyday life. Here, there are endless activities to choose from - travellers can unwind through fishing or swimming, explore the natural scenery by hiking or biking, or take part in one of many exciting water sports. This destination is also diverse; visitors of all ages and backgrounds come here to soak up the beauty and experience everything it has to offer. It's no surprise that this Michigan gem is such a popular spot for families, couples and groups of friends alike.

Lakes 

 Lake Michigan

Of the five Great Lakes of North America, Lake Michigan stands out as it is completely contained in the US borders. Boasting a large surface area and remarkable volume, this lake has clear waters and off-white sandy beaches that attract many visitors to its shores. Splendid dune formations and mesmerizing views await those who explore its depths with water activities like sailing, yachting, sea kayaking, diving and lake surfing. Moreover, the numerous beautiful islands and parks found on or offshore guarantee an even more enjoyable experience.

 Lake Huron

With its clear crystal waters, stunning sunrises, and white-sand beaches, Lake Huron is considered one of the most beautiful lakes in Northern Michigan. There are over 30,000 islands on Lake Huron's shoreline, making it the second-largest Great Lake with a depth of over 300 feet. The pristine turquoise waters of Lake Huron are unsurpassed. It is no wonder it was named “La Mer Douche” meaning "freshwater sea."

 Lake Superior

Talking about Michigan's incredible lakes, Lake Superior stands out from the rest. As one of the largest bodies of water in the world, it's home to more than 80 species of fish- an ideal spot for fishing enthusiasts. Apart from that, visitors can also opt for camping, diving, hiking and kayaking around the lake. Its breathtaking views with sea-caves and iconic lighthouses makes it all the more attractive for tourists who are looking for a truly memorable experience.

 Lake Erie

Lake Erie, situated at the Michigan-Ohio border and one of the Great Lakes, is renowned for its teeming fish population – namely, the famed Lake Erie walleye. It likewise has several avenues for recreational activities such as swimming, golfing and more, due to its accessibility from Northern Michigan. Visitors can explore a plethora of national and local parks in the area including the Lake Erie Metropark to discover its hidden gems.

 Torch Lake

Michigan’s Torch Lake is an aquatic gem. At 19 miles long and 285 feet deep, it is the deepest inland lake in Northern Michigan and a haven for nature enthusiasts. Whether you prefer fishing, kayaking, diving, hiking, canoeing or just relaxing on the beach, you are sure to appreciate its Caribbean-like turquoise waters, long white sand bars and picturesque beauty - no wonder National Geographic called it the most beautiful lake in the world!

 Elk Lake

Elk Lake, located near Elk Rapids in Northern Michigan, has earned its way onto our list of amazing lakes. It has a depth of 193 feet and is the second deepest inland lake in the area - just behind Torch Lake. Not only does it boast crystal clear waters, but it also provides excellent opportunities for water sports and fishing - particularly trout fishing. Those looking to ski, sail, kayak or ice-boat can find plenty to do here; while those seeking a more peaceful experience are lured in by its tranquil atmosphere.

 Lake Charlevoix

Lake Charlevoix is a major attraction in Northern Michigan, boasting a phenomenal 56 miles of shoreline. Its sparkling waters and white-sand beaches allow for various recreational activities such as kayaking, swimming, fishing, diving, boating, and sailing. It's also situated conveniently close to the town of Charlevoix where visitors can get some rest or grab a bite to eat after an enjoyable day on the lake. What makes this lake remarkable is not just its size but also its beauty - it would take sixty miles to paddle the whole shoreline!

 Houghton Lake

Houghton Lake is the largest inland lake in Michigan and one of the greatest natural inland lakes in the US. Spanning 10 miles from north to south, it's a popular destination for resorting and fishing throughout the year. People know this spot best as the home of Tip-Up-Town USA, a renowned ice fishing and winter sports festivity. Beyond that, multiple occasions occur on the lake itself when it is completely frozen over. Its incredible 20,044 acres make Houghton Lake one of Northern Michigan's most extraordinary lakes.

 Big Glen Lake

The lake is located near Lake Michigan in Leelanau County. Together with its sister lake, Little Glen Lake, it covers about 6,000 acres of water. With rolling dunes, dense forests, and crystal clear water, this lake is the perfect place for kayaking, swimming, and relaxing. Alligator Hill offers stunning views of the lake as well as Lake Michigan.

 Lake St. Clair

The last but certainly not the least is Lake St. Clair, one of the best lakes for boating in Michigan. There are multiple beaches along this lake with clear water and a sand bottom bordered by shade trees and grass. There are also many sailing and boating clubs along the shores of Lake St Clair. Besides these, Lake St Clair is a popular freshwater lake for outdoor recreation and sports fishing. It is a fascinating lake for family relaxation and adventure.

References

Unincorporated communities in Antrim County, Michigan
Census-designated places in Michigan
Unincorporated communities in Michigan
Census-designated places in Antrim County, Michigan